His (or Her) Majesty's Principal Secretary of State for India, known for short as the India Secretary or the Indian Secretary, was the British Cabinet minister and the political head of the India Office responsible for the governance of the British Indian Empire (usually known simply as 'the Raj' or British India), Aden, and Burma. The post was created in 1858 when the East India Company's rule in Bengal ended and India, except for the Princely States, was brought under the direct administration of the government in Whitehall in London, beginning the official colonial period under the British Empire.

In 1937, the India Office was reorganised which separated Burma and Aden under a new Burma Office, but the same Secretary of State headed both departments and a new title was established as His Majesty's Principal Secretary of State for India and Burma. The India Office and its Secretary of State were abolished in August 1947, when the United Kingdom granted independence in the Indian Independence Act, which created two new independent dominions, India and Pakistan. Burma soon achieved independence separately in early 1948.

Secretaries of State for India, 1858–1937

Before the establishment of the British Empire on 2 August 1858, Lord Stanley had served as President of the Board of Control.

Secretaries of State for India and Burma, 1937–1947

Secretaries of State for Burma, 1947–1948

See also
India Office
British Raj
British rule in Burma
Governor-General of India
Imperial Civil Service
Government of India Act

Notes

External links

1858 establishments in the United Kingdom
India
Government of British India
Defunct ministerial offices in the United Kingdom
1947 disestablishments in the United Kingdom
1858 in India
Foreign Office during World War II

India Office